This is a list of the women who were queens as wives of Spanish monarchs from the 16th Century, when Spain was unified, until present. Francisco de Asís, Duke of Cádiz is the only King Consort, as the husband of Queen Isabella II.

House of Habsburg

House of Bourbon

House of Bonaparte

House of Bourbon (first restoration)

House of Savoy

House of Bourbon (second and third restoration)

See also 
 List of Spanish monarchs
 List of Aragonese consorts
 List of Asturian consorts
 List of Castilian consorts
 List of Leonese consorts
 List of Galician consorts
 List of Navarrese consorts

Spain, Royal Consorts of
Spain
Spain